Daniel Ntieche Moncharé (born 24 January 1982) is a Cameroonian former professional footballer who played as a centre-back.

Honours
FUS de Rabat
 CAF Confederation Cup: 2010

References

Living people
1982 births
Association football defenders
Cameroonian footballers
Sable FC players
Canon Yaoundé players
USM Alger players
Fath Union Sport players
Ittihad Khemisset players
Cameroonian expatriate sportspeople in Algeria
Expatriate footballers in Algeria
Cameroonian expatriate sportspeople in Morocco
Expatriate footballers in Morocco